|}

The Gordon Richards Stakes is a Group 3 flat horse race in Great Britain open to horses aged four years or older. It is run over a distance of 1 mile, 1 furlong and 209 yards at Sandown Park in late April.

History
The event was established in 1963, and it was originally called the Westbury Stakes. It was initially held in late May or early June.

The Westbury Stakes continued to be staged in May or June until 1973. That year's edition took place at Kempton Park. Its date was switched with that of the Brigadier Gerard Stakes in 1974, and from this point it was held in April.

The race was given its present title in 1987. It was renamed in memory of Sir Gordon Richards, a famous jockey who died the previous year.

The Gordon Richards Stakes is part of a two-day meeting which features both flat and jump races. Other events at the meeting include the Bet365 Gold Cup, the Celebration Chase, the Sandown Classic Trial and the Sandown Mile.

Records

Most successful horse (2 wins):
 Chancellor – 2002, 2004
 Crystal Ocean - 2018, 2019

Leading jockey (5 wins):
 Ryan Moore – Ask (2008), Tartan Bearer (2009), Glass Harmonium (2010), Crystal Ocean (2018, 2019)

Leading trainer (10 wins):
 Sir Michael Stoute – Hard Fought (1981), Dolpour (1990), Singspiel (1996), Little Rock (2000), Ask (2008), Tartan Bearer (2009), Glass Harmonium (2010), Ulysses (2017), Crystal Ocean (2018, 2019)

Winners since 1978

Earlier winners

 1963: Miralgo
 1964: Tacitus
 1965: Goupi
 1966: Super Sam
 1967: Chinwag
 1968: Sidon
 1969: Remand
 1970: Connaught
 1971: Arthur
 1972: Brigadier Gerard
 1973: Scottish Rifle 1
 1974: Funny Fellow / Tudor Rhythm 2
 1975: Never Return
 1976: Jolly Good
 1977: Lucky Wednesday

1 The 1973 running took place at Kempton Park.2 The 1974 race was a dead-heat and has joint winners.

See also
 Horse racing in Great Britain
 List of British flat horse races

References

 Paris-Turf:
 Racing Post:

 galopp-sieger.de – Gordon Richards Stakes (ex Westbury Stakes).
 horseracingintfed.com – International Federation of Horseracing Authorities – Gordon Richards Stakes (2018).
 pedigreequery.com – Gordon Richards Stakes – Sandown Park.
 

Open middle distance horse races
Sandown Park Racecourse
Flat races in Great Britain
Recurring sporting events established in 1963
1963 establishments in England